Frank Hadow defeated Robert Erskine 6–4, 6–4, 6–4 in the All Comers' Final, and then defeated the reigning champion Spencer Gore 7–5, 6–1, 9–7 in the challenge round to win the gentlemen's singles tennis title at the 1878 Wimbledon Championships.

Draw

Challenge round

All comers' finals

Earlier rounds

Section 1

The match between Clapham and Crum was not played.

Section 2

Section 3

References

External links

Singles
Wimbledon Championship by year – Men's singles